The United States Air Force's  239th Combat Communications Squadron is an Air National Guard combat communications unit located at Jefferson Barracks, Missouri.  The unit has approximately 120 personnel.

Lineage
 Constituted as the 239th Airways and Air Communications Service Flight
 Activated by February 1954
 Redesignated 239th	Mobile Communications Flight (Light) on 1 June 1961
 Redesignated 239th	Mobile Communications Flight
 Redesignated 239th	Combat Communications Flight on 1 April 1976
 Redesignated 239th	Combat Communications Squadron on 8 October 1982
 Redesignated 239th	Combat Information Systems Squadron on 1 July 1985
 Redesignated 239th	Combat Communications Squadron on 1 November 1986

Assignments
 242d Airways and Air Communications Service Squadron by February 1954
 254th Combat Communications Group251st Communications Group (later 251st Mobile Communications Group, 251st Combat Communications Group, 251st Combat Information Systems Group, 251st Combat Communications Group
 131st Bomb Wing

Stations
 Lambert Field (later Robertson Air National Guard Base), Missouri, by February 1954
 Jefferson Barracks, Missouri

Major Command/Gaining Command
 Airways and Air Communications Service (later Air Force Communications Service, Air Force Communications Command), by February 1954
 Air Combat Command, June 1992
 Air Force Space Command (???-2017)
  Air National Guard/Air Combat Command (2018 – present)

See also
 List of United States Air Force communications squadrons

References

Combat Communications 0239
Military units and formations in Missouri
Squadrons of the United States Air National Guard